Sulakshana Pandit is an Indian playback singer and former Bollywood leading lady belonging to the Mewati Gharana.

Career
Sulakshana's career as an actress spanned the 1970s and early '80s. As a leading lady she has worked with most of the top actors of the 1970s like Jeetendra, Sanjeev Kumar, Rajesh Khanna, Vinod Khanna, Shashi Kapoor and Shatrughan Sinha. Her acting career began with the suspense thriller Uljhan in 1975, opposite Sanjeev Kumar. In Anil Ganguly's Sankoch (1976), which was based on the novel Parineeta, she portrayed Lolita. Her other popular films include Hera Pheri, Apnapan, Khandaan, Chehre Pe Chehra, Dharam Kanta and Waqt Ki Deewar.

She acted in a Bengali movie Bandie 1978, where she was paired opposite Uttam Kumar.

Sulakshana had a singing career alongside her acting one. She began her singing career as a child singer singing the popular song "Saat Samundar Paar se" with Lata Mangeshkar in the 1967 film Taqdeer. Thereafter, she recorded with famed musicians such as Kishore Kumar and Hemant Kumar. She sang in Hindi, Bengali, Marathi, Oriya and Gujarati. In 1980, she released an album titled Jazbaat (HMV), wherein she rendered ghazals. She sang duets with accomplished singers such as Kishore Kumar, Lata Mangeshkar, Mohammed Rafi, Shailender Singh, Yesudas, Mahendra Kapoor and Udit Narayan. She sang under music directors such as Shankar Jaikishan, Laxmikant Pyarelal, Kalyanji Anandji, Kanu Roy, Bappi Lahiri, Usha Khanna, Rajesh Roshan, Khayyam, Rajkamal and several others. In 1986, Sulakshana was one of the singers to perform at the Royal Albert Hall in London to celebrate the "Festival of Indian Music" Concert along with acclaimed Music Directors Laxmikant Pyarelal and singers Manhar, Shabbir Kumar, Nitin Mukesh and Anuradha Paudwal.

Her voice was last heard in an alaap in the song "Saagar Kinare Bhi Do Dil" from the movie Khamoshi the musical (1996), which was composed by her brothers Jatin and Lalit.

Personal life
Sulakshana comes from a musical family originating from Pilimandori Village in Hissar (now Fatehabad) district of Haryana state. The famous classical vocalist and legendary Pandit Jasraj was her uncle. Ex Rajgarh MP & Jan Sangh leader Vasant Kumar Pandit was also her uncle. She started singing at the age of nine. Her elder brother Mandheer Pandit (who was earlier a music composer in the 1980s with Jatin Pandit as the duo Mandheer–Jatin) was her constant companion in Mumbai; they performed and sang on stage until Sulakshana became a leading playback singer through many of their live concerts with legends such as Kishore Kumar and Mohammed Rafi. 

She has three brothers (Mandheer, Jatin and Lalit Pandit) and three sisters (Late Maya Anderson, Late Sandhya Singh and Vijayta Pandit). Her father Pratap Narain Pandit was an accomplished classical vocalist. Her nephew Yash Pandit is an Indian television actor. Nieces Shraddha Pandit and Shweta Pandit are playback singers. Her cousin is playback singer Hemlata.

Sulakshana has never been married, after actor Sanjeev Kumar turned down her marriage proposal. She fell on hard times after she stopped getting work. Her sister Vijayta Pandit and brother-in-law, music composer Aadesh Shrivastava, had plans to compose a devotional album for her, but Aadesh died before he could. She broke her hip bone when she fell in the bathroom. Sulakshana makes rare public appearances after her four surgeries that left her impaired. She has given a full length radio interview wherein she spoke about her acting & singing career to RJ Vijay Akela in July 2017.

Filmography

As singer

As actress

Awards
 Filmfare Best Female Playback Award in 1975 for the song "Tu Hi Saagar Hai Tu Hi Kinara" in Sankalp (1975).
 Miyan Tansen Award in 1975 for the song "Tu Hi Saagar Hai Tu Hi Kinara" in Sankalp.
 Nominated as Filmfare Best Female Playback Award for rendering the classical "Bandhi Re Kahe Preet" in Sankoch (1976)

References

External links
 
Whatever happened to... Sulakshana Pandit

Bollywood playback singers
Indian film actresses
Actresses in Hindi cinema
Indian women playback singers
20th-century Indian singers
Living people
Year of birth missing (living people)
20th-century Indian actresses
20th-century Indian women singers
People from Raigarh
People from Raigarh district
People from Chhattisgarh
Women musicians from Chhattisgarh
Singers from Chhattisgarh
Actresses from Chhattisgarh
Filmfare Awards winners